Zak Richard Starkey (born 13 September 1965) is an English rock drummer who has performed and recorded with English rock band the Who since 1996. He is also the third drummer to have appeared with English rock band Oasis. In 2020, Starkey toured Brazil with U-Roy as guitarist. Other musicians and bands he has worked with include Johnny Marr, Paul Weller, the Icicle Works, the Waterboys, Bobby Womack, ASAP, the Lightning Seeds, John Entwistle, Sly & Robbie, Toots & The Maytals, Mykal Rose, Freddie McGregor, Big Youth, Jesse Royal, Tanya Stevens, Cecile and Sshh Liguz. Starkey is a son of the Beatles' drummer Ringo Starr.

Early life
Zak Richard Starkey was born on 13 September 1965, at Queen Charlotte's and Chelsea Hospital in Hammersmith, London, to the Beatles' drummer Ringo Starr (Richard Starkey) and Maureen Starkey, Starr's first wife. He grew up at Sunny Heights at St George's Hill in Surrey and Tittenhurst Park at Sunninghill, Berkshire, and attended Highgate School in London until 1981.

At the age of eight, Starkey was given a drum kit by the Who's drummer, Keith Moon. Moon (known to young Zak as "Uncle Keith") was one of his father's closest friends and Starkey's godfather. Although they never sat together at a drum kit, Moon discussed drumming with him as a boy. The drum kit was later sold at Sotheby's for £12,000.

Starkey subsequently began teaching himself to play the drums. His father gave him only one lesson, but he discouraged his growing interest because of the desire not to see him in the same business. Although Starr has praised his son's abilities, he had always regarded him as a future lawyer or doctor. Starr's close friend, Kenney Jones, drummer for the Faces and Moon's replacement in the Who, stated that he "virtually taught" the young Starkey to play drums. By the age of twelve, Starkey was performing in pubs as a member of the garage band The Next. After Moon's death, Jones gifted the teenage Starkey a white drum kit formerly owned by Moon, which had been kept in storage by the Who.

Career

Spencer Davis, Eddie Hardin, John Entwistle and the Icicle Works
In the early 1980s, Starkey appeared with a re-formed Spencer Davis Group. His daughter Tatia was born on 7 September 1985. He briefly joined The Semantics, replacing founding drummer Jody Spence, during the recording process for their album Powerbill, which ended up being unreleased except in Japan. He joined the band when they moved from Nashville to Los Angeles, and played in some shows and some recording sessions, but the band broke up less than a year after he joined.

In 1985 he played on John Entwistle's solo album The Rock (released in 1996). Starkey replaced Chris Sharrock as the drummer in the Icicle Works in 1989, leaving the band the next year without appearing on any recordings with them. A B-side later issued by founder member Ian McNabb, featured him on drums and is presumed to date from his tenure with the group. Starkey also played on the 1989 album Silver and Gold, a solo work released by Iron Maiden guitarist Adrian Smith.

Ringo Starr and the All-Starr Band
In 1985, he joined his father on Sun City by Artists United Against Apartheid and during 1992 and 1995, Starkey toured with Ringo Starr and His All-Starr Band, having previously guested on the band's 1989 tour. Starkey performed at Ringo Starr's 70th birthday party on 7 July 2010 at Radio City Music Hall in New York City. He joined his father and guest stars Yoko Ono, Nils Lofgren, Steven Van Zandt and Jeff Lynne for "With a Little Help from My Friends" and "Give Peace a Chance".

The Who 1996–present
In 1994, he joined John Entwistle and Roger Daltrey of the Who on a tour entitled "Daltrey Sings Townshend", which had developed from a two-night performance at Carnegie Hall to celebrate Daltrey's fiftieth birthday. In 1996, Starkey left his band Face, to work with the Who on their Quadrophenia tour. He received good reviews in this role and was praised by the music press for his strong drumming presence, without trying to emulate the band's original drummer Keith Moon. Both Townshend and Daltrey stated that Starkey was the best match for the band since the death of Keith Moon.

On 20 October 2001, he performed with the Who at the Concert for New York City at Madison Square Garden. This was heralded as the Who's "comeback" performance and they stole the show. Rolling Stone called their performance "one of the 50 moments that changed rock and roll". It was also one of John Entwistle's final appearances with the band.
On 7 February 2010, Starkey appeared with the Who during the half-time show of Super Bowl XLIV at the Sun Life Stadium, Miami, Florida.

Starkey was not available to record for most of the Who's 2006 album Endless Wire, as he had been on the road with Oasis and only had time to play on one track. However, he did join the Who for The Who Tour 2006-2007 in support of the album, during which they headlined at Glastonbury Festival in 2007. The tour finished at the Hartwall Areena in Helsinki, Finland on 9 July 2007. Pete Townshend's official website stated that Starkey was afterwards invited to become a full member of the Who, stating: "Some of you may have noticed in one of my recent diary postings that I welcomed Zak into the Who as a permanent member. This is something he doesn't feel he needs or wants. Let's just say that the door is always open to this amazing musician and whenever we can, we will always try to make it possible for Zak to work with the Who in the future." On 12 July 2008, Starkey played drums for the Who at the 3rd annual VH1 Rock Honors, which celebrated the band's long career.

On 30 March 2010, he played with the band during their performance of Quadrophenia at the Royal Albert Hall in aid of the Teenage Cancer Trust. 
On 12 August 2012, he played with the Who at the finale of the 2012 Summer Olympics closing ceremony and later that year, on 12 December, he joined them at 12-12-12: The Concert for Sandy Relief. Starkey also joined the Who on their 2012–13 Quadrophenia and More tour, but he had to back out in February 2013 when he developed tendonitis but he re-joined the Who in September 2014 for their Who Hits 50 tour of UK and Europe and North America. in July 2015 and other shows during this year as part of The Who Hits 50! tour, which had started in 2014. This tour went on to include the Who at Desert Trip concert at Coachella Festival in California on 28 June 2015. Starkey also appeared with the Who when they performed as the headline act at the Glastonbury Festival. During this time, Starkey also played shows with Mick Jones of The Clash and formed The Silver Machine with Bobby Gillespie, Andrew Innes, Glen Matlock and Little Barrie.

In September 2016, Starkey was interviewed by Rolling Stone about the new covers album he was working on with Sharna Liguz, compiled with songs that had influenced them. They recorded these with the original members from each of the relevant bands. Funding for album's ten tracks was raised by a crowdfunding campaign through the Pledgemusic site. Under the name SSHH, Starkey and Liguz also recorded other tracks.

1996–2003 Johnny Marr & The Healers
In 2000, Starkey was a founding member of Johnny Marr & The Healers, although their first album, Boomslang, would not be released for another three years after which the band did a world tour in 2003. On 14 April 2001, he featured in both of the backing bands for the "Steve Marriott Tribute Concert", in which he appeared along with Rick Wills, Rabbit Bundrick, Bobby Tench, Noel Gallagher and Paul Weller.

Oasis 2004–2009
During 2004, Starkey joined the Britpop band Oasis and was also featured on two tracks included on the Who's biographic album, The Who: Then and Now. In May 2005, Noel Gallagher revealed to the BBC that Starkey had participated in the recording sessions for Don't Believe the Truth. Starkey had recorded all but one track of these sessions which were originally called "Mucky Fingers" and were also for an official promotional video for the album. After the completion of these sessions Starkey stated: "It was amazing. They're all singers, they're all guitar players, they're all songwriters, they're all producers and they're all drummers."

He travelled as a sideman on the year-long Oasis tour that followed and appeared in promotional videos for the associated singles. Despite this, he was not an official member of the band and rarely appeared with them in promotions. In April 2005, Noel Gallagher confirmed that he had been invited to be their official drummer and added that this could not materialize before his current working engagements with the Who were completed in mid-2007. Their former drummer also had to be "paid out" contractually out of the band. On 14 February 2007, Starkey appeared with Oasis when they received the BRIT Award for outstanding contribution to music.

His participation in the making of the Oasis album, Dig Out Your Soul, was confirmed on 11 December 2007, when the official Oasis website published a picture of him with the other band members. However, it was announced that he would not perform on the Dig Out Your Soul Tour after falling out with Noel Gallagher subsequently departing in 2008 and was replaced by Chris Sharrock. A year later he recalled that playing with them was "massive" and called the band "some of the smartest musicians I've ever met".

Penguins Rising
In 2008, Starkey formed the band Penguins Rising which had previously been called Penguin, along with his partner Sharna Liguz. The band's original line up also included his daughter Tatia. Penguins Rising went on to support Kasabian and Beady Eye on their respective tours. They released an album under the moniker of Pengu!ns, entitled Hatemale, in 2011. Sshh signed to BMG as a solo artist in 2018, and the duo toured Australia opening for Primal Scream and then Liam Gallagher in support of the Sshh single "Rising Tide".

Jamaica and reggae albums 2016–present

Starkey went on to build a studio in Ocho Rios and formed the in-house recording group with Sshh Liguz, Sly & Robbie, Tony Chin, Cyril Neville and Robbie Lyn. In 2016, he launched the record label Trojan Jamaica based on the island, co-funded by BMG Rights Management. The Trojan name was licensed for use from the Trojan Records label. The label was formed with a mandate to reflect music from Jamaica along with soul and blues from America. Recording on Trojan Jamaica and with the roles of co-producer and guitarist he is credited on the albums 'Red Gold Green & Blue', 'Red Gold Green & Blue RMXZ' both released in 2019. In 2020, RGGB RMXZ was released, while Got To Be Tough by Toots & The Maytals followed the same year. This won a Grammy for Best Reggae Album that year. Additionally, the album Solid Gold was released by U-Roy, featuring Ziggy Marley, Santigold, Shaggy, Big Youth, Mick Jones of the Clash (Starkey has previously gigged with Jones), Richie Spice, Tarrus Riley, Jesse Royal, and Rygin King. At this time, Starkey and his partner's band Shhh appeared at the invitation of the Peter Tosh Museum in Kingston, Jamaica, performing their version of Get Up, Stand Up (featuring Soul Syndicate and Eddie Vedder).

Personal life 
Starkey married Sharna Liguz, his partner of 18 years, on March 21, 2022. The couple had chosen the date in honour of their daughter Luna Lee Lightnin, who was born a year earlier. The wedding was held at the Sunset Marquis Hotel in West Hollywood, California. Eddie Vedder and Johnny Marr served as Starkey's best men, while reggae musician Pato Banton officiated the ceremony. In 1985, he was married to Sarah Menikides (born 1959). They separated in 2006 and divorced in 2021.

Associated acts
 The Icicle Works (1988)
 Ringo Starr & His All-Starr Band (1992–1995)
 The Semantics (1993–1996)
 The Who (1996–present)
 John Entwistle (1986–1997)
 The Lightning Seeds (1997–2000)
 Johnny Marr and the Healers (2000–2003)
 Oasis (2004–2008)
 u-Roy
 Big Youth
 Sly & Robbie
 Toots and The Maytals
 mykal Rose
 Freddie MacGregor
 Jesse Royal
 Rygin King
Silver Machine

Discography
 Artists United Against Apartheid  Sun City (1985)
 Roger Daltrey  Under a Raging Moon (1985)
 John Entwistle – The Rock (1985)
 Paul Weller and Graham Coxon 
 ASAP  Silver and Gold (1989)
 Ringo Starr  Ringo Starr and His All-Starr Band (1990)
 Ringo Starr  Ringo Starr and His All-Starr Band Volume 2: Live from Montreux (1993)
 Tony Martin  Back Where I Belong (1992)
 Moody Marsden band  Never Turn our back on the Blues (1992)
 Robert Hart  Robert Hart (1992)
 Eikichi Yazawa  Anytime Woman(1992)
 The Semantics  Powerbill (1996)
 John Entwistle  The Rock (1996)
 Simon Townshend  Among Us (1996)
 Ringo Starr  Ringo Starr and His Third All-Starr Band Volume 1 (1996)
 Eddie Hardin  Wizard's Convention, Vol. 2 (1997)
 The Lightning Seeds – Like You Do (1997)
 The Lightning Seeds  Tilt (1999)
 Sasha  Surfin' on a Backbeat (2001)
 Johnny Marr and the Healers  Boomslang (2003)
 The Who  Then and Now (2004)
 Oasis  Don't Believe the Truth (2005)
 The Who  Endless Wire (2006)
 Broken English  The Rough with the Smooth (2007)
 Oasis  Dig Out Your Soul (2008)
 The Who  Who (2019)
 Toots and the Maytals  Got to Be Tough (2020)
 U-Roy  Solid Gold (2021)
 Various  Red Gold Green & Blue (2019)
 Peter Green Tribute (2021)
 Various  RGGB RMXZ (2019)
 SSHH  Issues (2016)

References

External links

1965 births
Living people
ASAP (band) members
English rock drummers
Oasis (band) members
People educated at Highgate School
People from Chipping Barnet
People from Finchley
People from Hammersmith
People from Sunninghill
People from Weybridge
Ringo Starr family
Ringo Starr
The Best (band) members
The Icicle Works members
The Lightning Seeds members
The Who members
Ringo Starr & His All-Starr Band members